RMQ may refer to

 Taichung International Airport (IATA airport code)
 Range minimum query, a problem in computer science
 RabbitMQ, an Advanced Message Queuing Protocol implementation